Graduated from Moss Point High School in Moss Point, MS - info from his brother

Aubrey Derron Matthews (born September 15, 1962) is a former professional football player in the National Football League. He has 3 children (2 daughters and a son), 2 grandchildren (boy and girl) and two step daughters from his current marriage.

Career
Matthews, a wide receiver from Delta State University, was never drafted by an NFL team, but played 11 NFL seasons for the Atlanta Falcons, the Green Bay Packers and the Detroit Lions.

References

External links
Pro-Football Statistics
NFL Profile
Profile & Statistics

1962 births
Living people
People from Pascagoula, Mississippi
American football wide receivers
Delta State Statesmen football players
Atlanta Falcons players
Green Bay Packers players
Detroit Lions players
Ed Block Courage Award recipients